Carl Columbus Yowell (December 20, 1902 – July 27, 1985) was a professional baseball pitcher. He played for two seasons in Major League Baseball for the Cleveland Indians in 1924-25.

External links

Major League Baseball pitchers
Cleveland Indians players
Tyler Trojans players
Chattanooga Lookouts players
Rochester Tribe players
Newark Bears (IL) players
Baseball players from Virginia
People from Madison, Virginia
1902 births
1985 deaths